New York's 14th State Assembly district is one of the 150 districts in the New York State Assembly. It has been represented by Republican David McDonough since a special election in 2002.

Geography
District 14 is located entirely within Nassau County. It includes portions of the town of Hempstead, including Bellmore, North Bellmore, Wantagh and Merrick. A portion of Jones Beach is within this district.

Recent election results

2022

2020

2018

2016

2014

2012

References

14
Nassau County, New York